Lee Ann Meriwether (born May 27, 1935) is an American actress, former model, and the winner of the Miss America 1955 pageant. She has appeared in many films and television shows, notably as Betty Jones, the title character's secretary and daughter-in-law in the 1970s crime drama Barnaby Jones starring Buddy Ebsen. The role earned her two Golden Globe Award nominations in 1975 and 1976, and an Emmy Award nomination in 1977. She is also known for her portrayal of Catwoman, replacing Julie Newmar in the film version of Batman (1966), and for a co-starring role on the science fiction series The Time Tunnel. Meriwether had a recurring role as Ruth Martin on the daytime soap opera All My Children until the end of the series in September 2011.

Early life
Meriwether was born in Los Angeles, California, to Claudius Gregg Meriwether and Ethel Eve Mulligan. She has one brother, Don Brett Meriwether. She grew up in San Francisco after the family moved there from Phoenix, Arizona. She attended George Washington High School, where one of her classmates was Johnny Mathis. She later attended City College of San Francisco, where one of her classmates was fellow actor Bill Bixby.

After winning Miss San Francisco, Meriwether won Miss California 1954, then was crowned Miss America in 1955 with her recital of a John Millington Synge monologue. She then appeared that Sunday on What's My Line?, hosted by John Charles Daly (who also emceed the pageant that year). Following her reign as Miss America, she joined the Today show.

An August 1, 1956, international news wirephoto of Meriwether and Joe DiMaggio announced their engagement. According to DiMaggio biographer Richard Ben Cramer, however, it was a rumor started by Walter Winchell.

Career

1950s
Meriwether was a "Today Girl" on NBC's The Today Show from 1955 to 1956. Her feature film debut came in 1959 as Linda Davis in 4D Man, starring Robert Lansing. She appears in The Phil Silvers Show episode, "Cyrano de Bilko".

1960s

In 1961, Meriwether guest starred once as Gloria in the episode "Buddy and the Amazon" on her first husband's (Frank Aletter) one-season CBS sitcom, Bringing Up Buddy. She also appeared in Leave It To Beaver episode "Community Chest" in season four. In 1962, she was cast as Martha Elweiss in the episode "My Child Is Yet a Stranger" on the CBS anthology series, The Lloyd Bridges Show. She played Nurse Dickens in a 1962 episode of the ABC sitcom, I'm Dickens, He's Fenster. From 1963 to 1965, she was cast in different roles in eight episodes of the NBC medical drama, Dr. Kildare. In 1964, she played the character Jeanelle in "This Is Going to Hurt Me More Than It Hurts You" on the CBS adventure series, Route 66. In 1965, she appeared in an episode on The Jack Benny Program as The Secretary. In a 1965 episode of 12 O'Clock High, "Mutiny at Ten Thousand Feet", she played Lieutenant Amy Patterson, and in the episodes "The Idolator" (also 1965) and "The Outsider" (1966), she played Captain Phyllis Vincent. She also guest starred in the season 2 episode "Big Brother". She was a regular on the single season science fiction television series The Time Tunnel with James Darren and Robert Colbert in 1966–67.

Meriwether appeared as Dr. Egret on the NBC series, The Man from U.N.C.L.E. ("The Mad, Mad Tea Party", 1965) and in an episode of Hazel ("How to Lose 30 Pounds in 30 Minutes", also 1965) she played Miss Wilson, the owner of an exercise studio. Meriwether portrayed The Catwoman for the Batman movie (1966), and also appeared in two episodes of the Batman TV series in 1967 as Lisa Carson, a love interest to Bruce Wayne in the episodes "King Tut's Coup" and "Batman's Waterloo". In the late 1960s and early 1970s, she had guest starring roles in numerous TV series, including The Fugitive, Mannix, Star Trek episode "That Which Survives" (1969), Perry Mason episodes #245 "The Case of the Cheating Chancellor" and "The Case of the Frustrated Folksinger" (both 1965), and the F Troop episode "O'Rourke vs. O'Reilly".

In films, she joined John Wayne and Rock Hudson for The Undefeated, and Andy Griffith in Angel in My Pocket (both 1969). In the same year as those two films, she played IMF spy Tracey in six Mission: Impossible episodes during season four after Barbara Bain's departure.

1970s

Meriwether began her award-nominated role as secretary and daughter-in-law Betty Jones in the 1973–1980 CBS series Barnaby Jones, opposite Buddy Ebsen. During the series' eight-year run she enjoyed an on- and off-screen chemistry with the elder Ebsen. During the series' run, she was reunited with her former classmate and best friend Bill Bixby during one episode. After her stint on Barnaby Jones, Meriwether became best friends with Ebsen, keeping in touch for many years until his death on July 6, 2003. She starred in the 1978 television movies True Grit: A Further Adventure with Warren Oates as Rooster Cogburn and Cruise Into Terror with an all-star ensemble cast, appeared on Circus of the Stars four times, and was a regular panelist on the game show Match Game.

1980s
Meriwether portrayed Lily Munster in the 1988–1991 revival of the 1960s television sitcom The Munsters, titled The Munsters Today, in which she starred alongside Jason Marsden, John Schuck, Howard Morton and Hilary Van Dyke. She also made several guest appearances on  The Love Boat and Fantasy Island.

1990s
In the 1990s, she appeared as herself on an episode of Space Ghost Coast to Coast. In 1993, she guest starred on Murder, She Wrote, episode "Ship of Thieves". In 1996, Meriwether took over for Mary Fickett in the role of Ruth Martin on the soap opera All My Children, Fickett having played the role since its inception in 1970. After twenty-six years, Fickett wanted to go into semi-retirement as a recurring cast member. Negotiations with the network broke down and Meriwether was cast as Ruth Martin. In 1998, ABC deemed that they were at an impasse with Meriwether's agents and Mary Fickett was brought back as a recurring cast member. Fickett retired again, this time for good in December 2000. ABC decided to bring back the character of Ruth Martin in 2002, but Fickett remained in retirement. Meriwether was hence brought back and remained a featured recurring performer on the show until it ended.

2000s

In 2002, she appeared in the documentary film Miss America. In 2003, Meriwether appeared in the TV-Movie Return to the Batcave: The Misadventures of Adam and Burt. She also appeared off-Broadway in the interactive comedy, Grandma Sylvia's Funeral. She voiced Big Mama in the video game Metal Gear Solid 4: Guns of the Patriots for the PlayStation 3. She also appears in one of the game's opening videos as a talkshow host having an interview with David Hayter, who voices Solid Snake in the game. In 2006, she joined James Garner, Abigail Breslin, Bill Cobbs and others in The Ultimate Gift. In 2008, Meriwether had a brief cameo as comic book character Battle Diva in the episode "Harper Knows" of the Disney Channel original series Wizards of Waverly Place. In 2010, she was once again reunited on screen with Hollywood veteran Bill Cobbs in No Limit Kids: Much Ado About Middle School. She voices President Winters in the video game Vanquish by PlatinumGames.

2010s
Meriwether continued to work on stage, television, game voice-overs, and feature films. She has made guest appearances on Desperate Housewives, Hawaii Five-0, The League, and Don't Trust the B---- in Apartment 23. Most recently, she revisited her role as Miss Hastings in the sequel/prequel to The Ultimate Gift, The Ultimate Life (2013), directed by Michael Landon Jr. She is also starring in the short film Kitty.

She also makes appearances at Comic Cons where she speaks about her roles in Batman, Star Trek, and Time Tunnel.

Personal life
On April 20, 1958, Meriwether married Frank Aletter. They had two daughters, actresses Kyle Aletter-Oldham and Lesley A. Aletter, and divorced in 1974. On September 21, 1986, Meriwether married Marshall Borden.

Filmography

Film

Television

Video games

Awards
1975 Golden Globe Award nomination, Best TV Actress (Drama)
1976 Golden Globe Award nomination, Best TV Actress (Drama)
1977 Emmy Award nomination, Outstanding Continuing Performance by a Supporting Actress in a Drama Series

References

External links

 
 
 
 
 
 
 
 

1935 births
Living people
American film actresses
American soap opera actresses
American television actresses
American video game actresses
American voice actresses
Miss America winners
Actresses from Los Angeles
Actresses from San Francisco
Actresses from New York City
City College of San Francisco alumni
Miss America Preliminary Swimsuit winners
20th-century American actresses
21st-century American actresses